Frička is a village and municipality in Bardejov District in the Prešov Region of north-east Slovakia.

History
In historical records the village was first mentioned in 1618.

Geography
The municipality lies at an altitude of 500 metres and covers an area of 8.279 km2.
It has a population of about 255 people.

Genealogical resources

The records for genealogical research are available at the state archive "Statny Archiv in Presov, Slovakia"

 Roman Catholic church records (births/marriages/deaths): 1800-1895 (parish B)
 Greek Catholic church records (births/marriages/deaths): 1781-1899 (parish B)

See also
 List of municipalities and towns in Slovakia

References

External links
 
 https://web.archive.org/web/20120110123130/http://www.fricka.sk/
Surnames of living people in Fricka

Villages and municipalities in Bardejov District
Šariš